En 50 ans  is a Belgian 1958 documentary film.

Synopsis 
The film commemorates the 50 years of colonisation in Upper Katanga. The commentator alludes to a population "stuck in its own traditions" that needs to learn new technologies. Workers from Ruanda-Urundi land at Elizabethville's airport to work in the mines. First they are driven to "acclimatisation reserves". Later they will be relocated to workers’ quarters. A tribute to the colonial heritage and its creation of, amongst other things, schools, hospitals, maternity wards and orphanages.

References 

1958 films
1950s short documentary films
1958 documentary films
Belgian short documentary films
1958 short films
Belgian colonisation in Africa